The 2010-11 Grameenphone Bangladesh League started on the 27 December 2010. 12 teams competed with each other on a home and away basis. 2010-11 was the fourth Bangladeshi league season in the professional and the second since being was renamed from B League to Bangladesh League in order to combat suggestions that it is a second-tier league. Sheikh Jamal Dhanmondi Club won the league and won the right to represent Bangladesh in the 2012 AFC President's Cup (later withdrawing from the continental competition).

Clubs and stadiums

Clubs:
Chittagong Abahani, Chittagong
Dhaka Abahani, Dhaka
Arambagh, Dhaka
Brothers Union, Dhaka
Farashganj, Dhaka
Feni Soccer Club, Feni
Chittagong Mohammedan, Chittagong
Dhaka Mohammedan, Dhaka
Muktijoddha Sangsad, Dhaka
Rahmatganj, Dhaka
Sheikh Russell, Dhaka
Sheikh Jamal Dhanmondi Club, Dhaka

Stadiums:
Bangabandhu National Stadium, Dhaka
MA Aziz Stadium, Chittagong
Shaheed Salam Stadium, Feni

Final standings

Season statistics

Goalscorers

Hat-tricks

References

Bangladesh Football Premier League seasons
Bangladesh
1
1